The Adanson system, published by French botanist Michel Adanson as the Familles des plantes in two volumes in 1763, was an important step in botanical nomenclature by establishing the ordering of genera into families. 

Michel Adanson listed 58 families, divided by sections, for the 1615 genera known to him. He gave these both French and Latin names. The system was completed by Antoine Laurent de Jussieu in 1789.

Plant families
Adanson's listing (Pages 1-7 of Part II) of families is as follows (with page numbers of families together with sections and genera in parentheses).Note spelling varies throughout text. The detailed descriptions of families are separately paginated, and shown here in italics, after the Latin names. Some families shown with sections (note not all sections were named, some were just described).

 Bissus (page 8) Byssi
 Champignons Fungi 4 
 Fucus Fuci 12 
 Epatikes Hepaticae 14
 Foujeres Filices 16
 Palmiers Palmae 22
 Gramens Gramina 26
 Liliasees (page 9) Liliaceae 42
 Junci 46
 Lilia
 Scillae
 Cepae
 Asparagi 51
 Hyacinthi 52
 Narcissi 55
 Irides 58
 Jenjanbres Zingiberes 61
 Orchis Orchides 68
 Aristoloches Aristolochiae 71
 Eleagnus Elaeagni 77
 Onagres Onagrae 81
 Mirtes (page 10) Myrti 86
 Ombelliferes Umbelletae 89
 Composees Compositae 103
 Campanules (page 11) Campanulae 132
 Briones Bryoniae 135
 Aparines Aparines 140
 Scabieuses Scabiosae 148
 Chevrefeuilles Caprifolia 153
 Aireles Vaccinia 160
 Apocins Apocyna 167
 Bouraches Borragines 173
 Labiees (page 12) Labiatae 180
 Vervenes Verbenae 195
 Personees Personatae 202
 Solanons Solana 215
 Jasmins Jasmina 220 
 Anagallis (page 13) Anagallides 227
 Salikaires Salicariae 232
 Pourpiers Portulacae 235
 Joubarbes Seda 246
 Alsines Alsines 250
 Blitons Blita 258
 Jalaps Jalapae 263
 Amarantes Amaranthi 266
 Espargoutes Spergulae 270
 Persikaires Persicariae 273
 Garou (page 14) Thymelaeae 278
 Rosiers Rosae 286
 Jujubiers Zizyphi 297
 Legumineuses Leguminosae 306
 Pistachiers (page 15) Pistaciae 332
 Titimales Tithymali 346
 Anones Anonae 359
 Chataigners Castaneae 366
 Tilleuls Tiliae 378
 Geranions Gerania 384
 Mauves Malvae 390
 Capriers Capparides 402
 Cruciferes (page 16) Cruciferae 409
 Pavots Papavera 425 
 Cistes Cisti 434
 Renoncules Ranunculi 451
 Arons Ara 461
 Pins (page 17) Pinus 473
 Mousses Musci 482

Notes

References

Bibliography 

 
 

Adanson system